Spirit River-Fairview was a provincial electoral district in northwestern Alberta, Canada mandated to return a single member to the Legislative Assembly of Alberta using the first-past-the-post method of voting from 1971 to 1986.

History
Spirit River-Fairview electoral district was created prior to the 1971 Alberta general election by merger of the Spirit River and Dunvegan electoral districts. The district was abolished in 1986 and recreated into Dunvegan.

Boundary history
Spirit River-Fairview was created in 1971 out of Dunvegan and the north half of Spirit River. It contained the communities of Spirit River, Fairview and Rycroft, and extended northward past the Chinchaga River. Its boundaries remained unchanged until it was abolished in 1986 and replaced by the second incarnation of Dunvegan.

Representation history

Spirit River-Fairview's first MLA was NDP leader Grant Notley. He is the father of premier Rachel Notley, who was seven years old when he was first elected. Notley was the only New Democrat elected in 1971, and would remain the party's only MLA until 1982. He served as leader of the opposition until his untimely death in a plane crash on October 19, 1984. Notley's closest competition during his career came in 1982 with Progressive Conservative physician Doug Snider who advocated for a hospital to be built in the community.

The resulting by-election in 1985 saw the NDP hold Spirit River-Fairview, with Jim Gurnett serving as MLA for the remainder of the term, after which the riding was abolished. This makes Spirit River-Fairview the only rural riding in Alberta to have elected only New Democrats to the Legislative Assembly.

Election results

1971 general election

|}
Swing is calculated from the 1967 result in Dunvegan, which had similar boundaries.

1975 general election

|}

1979 general election

|}

1982 general election

|}

1985 by-election

See also
 List of Alberta provincial electoral districts
 Spirit River (Alberta), a river in northern Alberta, Canada
 Spirit River, Alberta, a town in northern Alberta, Canada
 Fairview, Alberta, a town in northern Alberta, Canada

References

Further reading

External links
Elections Alberta
The Legislative Assembly of Alberta

Former provincial electoral districts of Alberta